LTSE is an acronym which can mean:
 Laws of technical systems evolution
 Long-Term Stock Exchange